Naglee Park and Ride Lot was a transit center in Tracy, California. The lot served as a bus hub for transportation on local, commuter, and long-distance bus services. It was closed by the city in spring 2016 after being sold for development as a Chipotle Mexican Grill and Panera Bread restaurant.

Tracer and taxi services offered local connections. San Joaquin Regional Transit District (RTD) offered commuter subscription service to the Dublin/Pleasanton BART station and job centers in Palo Alto, Mountain View, San Jose, Sunnyvale, Santa Clara, and Livermore on several lines. Amtrak Thruway Motorcoach services also stopped at this location and provided regional connections. Parking was offered for both bikes and vehicles and there are bus shelters and stops for transit.

Tracer
Tracer line B connected the lot with the West Valley Mall and downtown Tracy at the Tracy Transit Center via Lowell and Ealton Avenues. Line A also had the same terminals but traveled along Grant Line Road connecting areas on the northern end of town with downtown.

SMART
San Joaquin Regional Transit District local route 90 stopped here on its route to points east. There was also a once daily commuter service to Lawrence Livermore Lab and Sandia Laboratory in Livermore from Manteca through Tracy on line 153. Route 160 traveled between Lathrop and Dublin/Pleasanton BART station. SMART 166 took passengers to the job hub around Moffett Federal Airfield and the Lockheed Martin Transit Center/VTA station from Stockton and Manteca through Tracy and then through Pleasanton and into Sunnyvale. The 177 brought in commuters from Manteca, and Stockton to stops in Santa Clara/(Great America VTA station), San Jose/(Civic Center Station) and Milpitas. Also stopping here was line 167 from Ripon and Manteca to BART and Livermore Labs and line 171 from Lathrop and Stockton to BART. 173 traveled from Stockton and Lathrop to Lockheed Martin Station and Sunnyvale. Lastly bus line number 174 connected Stockton and Manteca with Mountain View and Palo Alto, return trip stops at Dublin/Pleasanton BART as well.

References

External links
google maps
San Joaquin RTD – Tracy Park-n-Ride
Transit Unlimited Profile

Tracy, California
Bus stations in California